is a former Japanese football player.

Playing career
Motohashi was born in Nishitokyo on August 3, 1982. After graduating from high school, he joined J1 League club Yokohama F. Marinos in 2001. However he could not play at all in the match. In 2002, he moved to J2 League club Shonan Bellmare on loan and played as offensive midfielder. In 2003, he returned to Yokohama F. Marinos. However he could hardly play in the match. In 2004, he moved to J2 club Sagan Tosu. He played many matches as regular player. In 2005, he moved to J2 club Montedio Yamagata. He played as regular player. However his opportunity to play decreased from 2006. Although the club was promoted to J1 end of 2008, he moved to J2 club Tochigi SC end of 2008 season without playing J1. He played many matches as regular player in 2009. However his opportunity to play decreased from 2010 and he could not play many matches from 2012. He retired end of 2013 season.

Club statistics

References

External links

1982 births
Living people
Association football people from Tokyo Metropolis
Japanese footballers
J1 League players
J2 League players
Yokohama F. Marinos players
Shonan Bellmare players
Sagan Tosu players
Montedio Yamagata players
Tochigi SC players
Association football midfielders
People from Nishitōkyō, Tokyo